The 1963 UCI Track Cycling World Championships were the World Championship for track cycling. They took place in Rocourt, Belgium from 1 to 7 August 1963. Nine events were contested, 7 for men (3 for professionals, 4 for amateurs) and 2 for women.

Medal summary

Medal table

See also
 1963 UCI Road World Championships

References

Track cycling
UCI Track Cycling World Championships by year
International cycle races hosted by Belgium
Sport in Liège
1963 in track cycling